Samb may refer to:

Samb Mour or Mour Samb (born 1994), Senegalese professional footballer
Amadou Samb (born 1988), Senegalese footballer
Cheikh Samb (born 1984), Senegalese former professional basketball player
Falou Samb (born 1997), Senegalese professional footballer
Issa Samb (1945–2017), Senegalese painter, sculptor, performance artist, playwright and poet
Mamadou Samb (born 1989), Senegalese-Spanish professional basketball player
Massata Samb, Senegalese politician
N'Diaga Samb (born 1966), Senegalese draughts player based in the Netherlands
Victor Samb (born 1985), Senegalese footballer
William Samb (died 2022), Papua New Guinean politician
Yamar Samb (born 1952), former Senegalese basketball player

See also
SAMB F.C., amateur football club based in Malacca, Malaysia
Samb-Adagio", a song by Danish percussion duo Safri Duo

Surnames of Senegalese origin